Walter Peter Pringle (17 July 1869 – 24 February 1945) was a New Zealand rugby union player. A forward, Pringle represented Wellington at a provincial level. He was a member of the New Zealand national side on their 1893 tour of Australia, playing in five matches including against New South Wales and Queensland.

References

1869 births
1945 deaths
Rugby union players from Lower Hutt
New Zealand rugby union players
New Zealand international rugby union players
Wellington rugby union players
Rugby union forwards